The Wedding is a 1998 television film directed by Charles Burnett. Based on the 1995 novel by Dorothy West and written for television by West and Lisa Jones, it stars Halle Berry, Eric Thal, and Lynn Whitfield, and was produced by Oprah Winfrey's production company, Harpo Productions. The story touches on the subjects of marriage, race, prejudice, class, and family in 1950s Martha's Vineyard.

The film aired on ABC on February 22 and February 23, 1998.

Plot
Shelby Cole (Halle Berry) returns to Martha's Vineyard and the Cole family home, in a section of town known as 'The Oval', to wed her white fiancé, jazz pianist and composer Meade Howell (Eric Thal). While her black high-society parents initially accept the pair, even arranging the wedding to be held at the mansion, they have growing misgivings as to the pair's ability to withstand the racial prejudice of the time, only made stronger after Meade admits that his own middle-class parents will not be attending the wedding because of their prejudice against their daughter-in-law-to-be.  Through frequent flashbacks throughout, we see the racial, societal and class choices made by Shelby's white great-grandmother on her mother's side (Shirley Knight), her grandparents and parents to insure the family's standing, even while those choices may have robbed them of the very happiness they sought.  While Shelby dismisses and even rebuffs much of their advice, her own doubts grow as she and Meade go through their own current experiences of racism and racial expectations.  Seeing her growing misgivings, Lute McNeil (Carl Lumbly), local architect, father and neighbor of the Coles, sees an opportunity to try to win Shelby's heart, having loved her from afar for some time.  With Lute's persistent, sometimes unwanted, attentions, Shelby starts to question her marrying Meade.  After a racist incident at a local restaurant, Shelby even confesses to Meade that she doesn't want to spend the rest of her life defending their relationship and asks him to give her time to finally decide.

Meanwhile, Shelby's mother Corinne (Lynn Whitfield) is battling her own demons within her marriage. Through the flashbacks, we see that her doctor husband Clark (Michael Warren) married her not for love, but for her lighter-skinned looks and status. In the present, Corinne discovers that Clark is having an affair, planning to leave her for his longtime nurse-assistant, Rachel (Charlayne Woodard) after the wedding.  However, his inability to resolve his guilt about his marriage and children over the years, and several badly-timed phone calls during the wedding to her leave Rachel sadly resigned to the belief that he will never leave Corinne and she leaves him to marry another. On hearing this, Clark decides to try to spark the love in his marriage again with Corinne.

At the same time, Shelby's sister, Liz (Cynda Williams) has her own tribulations with her darker-skinned husband, Dr. Lincoln Odis (Richard Brooks). Lincoln's parents were disinvited from Liz and Lincoln's own wedding by Corinne. Corinne cites Lincoln's parents' discomfort with the local community as the reason, but in actuality Corinne disliked Lincoln's parents' working-class status.  That act remains a true bone of contention between Lincoln and Corinne, and he initially refuses to attend Shelby's wedding.  With prodding, however, from Liz re-affirming her love for him and explaining that her mother's actions, while horrid, were not at all her own feelings, he finally agrees to come.

Meanwhile, Lute has insisted his wife (Patricia Clarkson) give him a divorce because of her family's prejudice against him and her own ambivalence. Lute's wife has returned from New York to plead her case for reconciliation, suspecting that his request for a speedy divorce in Mexico is spurred by his desire to wed another woman. Lute in a rage forces her out of their home and tries to drive her to the ferry out of town, but in the process accidentally hits his youngest daughter with his car. The noise of their argument has brought out the surrounding neighbors, including Shelby, who, shocked by Lute's vehemence, feels that she 'finally can see who Lute really is', accepting that good character and heart, not race or class, make the human being and turns her heart back to Meade. The two marry in the end.

External links

1998 films
1998 television films
1998 drama films
1990s English-language films
Harpo Productions films
Television shows based on American novels
Television series by Harpo Productions
Films directed by Charles Burnett (director)
Films scored by Stephen James Taylor
Martha's Vineyard in fiction
American drama television films
1990s American films